Barishah-e Beyg Morad (also Romanized as Barīshāh-e Beyg Morād; also known as Barīshāh, Barī Shāh, and Barshāh) is a village in Qalkhani Rural District, Gahvareh District, Dalahu County, Kermanshah Province, Iran. At the 2006 census, its population was 121, in 28 families.

References 

Populated places in Dalahu County